Benjamin Douglas Bowden (born October 21, 1994) is an American professional baseball pitcher in the Philadelphia Phillies organization. He played college baseball for Vanderbilt University. The Colorado Rockies selected Bowden in the second round of the 2016 Major League Baseball draft. He made his Major League Baseball (MLB) debut for the Rockies in 2021.

Amateur career
Bowden was born in Lynn, Massachusetts. He attended Lynn English High School, where he played for the school's baseball and basketball teams. As a senior, Bowden was named the state's high school baseball player of the year. He was named the 2013 Gatorade Player of the Year in Massachusetts. 

After high school, he enrolled at Vanderbilt University where he played college baseball for the Vanderbilt Commodores. After his sophomore season in 2015, he played collegiate summer baseball for the Yarmouth–Dennis Red Sox of the Cape Cod Baseball League, where he posted a 0.30 earned run average (ERA) with 43 strikeouts over 30 innings pitched, helped lead the Red Sox to the league championship, and was named playoff co-most valuable player. In 2016, his 10 saves were 4th in the SEC, and his 12.0 strikeouts per 9 innings were 5th.

Professional career

Colorado Rockies
The Colorado Rockies selected Bowden in the second round with the 45th overall selection of the 2016 Major League Baseball draft. He agreed to a $1.6 million signing bonus with the Rockies, and made his professional debut with the Asheville Tourists of the Class A South Atlantic League. He spent all of 2016 with Asheville, where he posted an 0–1 record with 3.04 ERA in 26 games, averaging 11.0 strikeouts per 9 innings. 

He did not pitch in 2017 due to injury. He began the 2018 season with Asheville and was promoted at midseason to the Lancaster JetHawks of the Class A-Advanced California League; over 52 innings pitched between the two teams, he went 7–2 with a 3.98 ERA and 78 strikeouts, averaging 13.5 strikeouts per 9 innings.

Bowden opened the 2019 season with the Hartford Yard Goats of the Class AA Eastern League, and served as Hartford's closer, before being promoted to the Albuquerque Isotopes of the Class AAA Pacific Coast League on June 20. Bowden was named to the 2019 All-Star Futures Game. Over 48 relief appearances between Hartford and Albuquerque, he pitched to a 1–3 record and a 3.48 ERA, averaging 14.7 strikeouts per 9 innings. His 20 saves with Hartford were 5th in the league, his 0.584 WHIP was 4th, and his 6.0 strikeouts per walk were 5th.The Rockies added him to their 40-man roster after the 2019 season. 

Bowden made the Rockies' 2021 Opening Day roster. On April 2, 2021, Bowden made his MLB debut in relief against the Los Angeles Dodgers, allowing two runs in  innings pitched with two strikeouts. In 39 games, he posted a 3–2 record with a 6.56 ERA in  innings.

During spring training in 2022, the Rockies optioned Bowden to Albuquerque.

Tampa Bay Rays
On April 29, 2022, Bowden was claimed off waivers by the Tampa Bay Rays. In eight games for the Triple-A Durham Bulls, he posted a 1.80 ERA with a 3–0 record in 10 innings. He was designated for assignment on May 31. He cleared waivers and was sent outright to Triple-A Durham on June 4.

San Francisco Giants
On July 24, 2022, Bowden was traded by the Rays to the San Francisco Giants. He elected free agency on November 10, 2022.

Philadelphia Phillies
On January 24, 2023, Bowden signed a minor league contract with the Philadelphia Phillies organization.

References

External links

1994 births
Living people
People from Lynn, Massachusetts
Baseball players from Massachusetts
Major League Baseball pitchers
Colorado Rockies players
Vanderbilt Commodores baseball players
Yarmouth–Dennis Red Sox players
Asheville Tourists players
Lancaster JetHawks players
Hartford Yard Goats players
Albuquerque Isotopes players